Domingos Teixeira de Abreu Fezas Vital  (born 27 September 1958) is a Portuguese diplomat. He served as Portuguese Ambassador to the United States from September 2015 to December 2021 and to The Bahamas. Currently he is the Portuguese Ambassador to the Holy See and to the Sovereign Order of Malta.

Career
Fezas Vital graduated from Federal University of Rio de Janeiro, Brazil, with a bachelor's degree in social and judicial sciences. He then studied international trade at the Free University of Brussels. Shortly after, in 1983, he joined the Portuguese Ministry of Foreign Affairs, where he started his diplomatic career as an attaché.

Throughout his diplomatic career Fezas Vital has held posts not only in embassies but also in international organisations, which Portugal is a member in, namely as a Portuguese representative to NATO and the Western European Union.

In 1996, three years before transfer of sovereignty over Macau, he was appointed diplomatic adviser to Governor Vasco Joaquim Rocha Vieira.

After his posting in Macau, Ambassador Fezas Vital returned to Portugal to work in the Ministry of Foreign Affairs until he was appointed Consul General of Portugal in São Paulo in 2000.

In 2010 he was appointed Ambassador and in March 2012 he became the Representative of Portugal to the European Union, a post he held until being posted to the US as Ambassador of Portugal. After serving in the United States, Domingos Fezas Vital was appointed, in 2021, Portuguese Ambassador to the Holy See.

Honours

National honours
  Commander of the Order of Prince Henry (7 December 1987)
  Grand Officer of the Order of Christ (26 March 2012)
  Grand-Cross of the Order of Prince Henry (9 April 2012)

Foreign honours
  Officer of the Order of Rio Branco, Brazil (27 April 1987)
  Commander of the Order of Civil Merit, Spain (20 March 1989)
  Commander by Number of the Order of Isabella the Catholic, Spain (30 November 2007)
  Commander First Class of the Order of the Polar Star, Sweden (9 May 2008)
  Commander's Cross with Star of the Order of Merit of the Republic of Poland, Poland (3 March 2009)
  Grand Officer of the Order of Merit of the Federal Republic of Germany, Germany (26 May 2009)
  Grand Officer of the Order of the Star of Jordan, Jordan (28 May 2009)
  Commander with Star of the Royal Norwegian Order of Merit, Norway (25 September 2009)
  Grand Officer of the Order of Bernardo O'Higgins, Chile (14 July 2010)
  Grand Officer of the Pontifical Equestrian Order of St. Gregory the Great, Holy See (3 September 2010)
  Grand-Cross of the Civilian Class of the Order pro Merito Melitensi, Sovereign Military Hospitaller Order of Saint John of Jerusalem of Rhodes and of Malta (23 November 2010)
  Grand Cross of the Order of Merit of the Grand Duchy of Luxembourg, Luxembourg (26 December 2010)

Publications
 Why the U.S. and Europe need each other, now more than ever, with Kirsti Kauppi, The Dallas Morning News, 2019

References

Ambassadors of Portugal to the United States
Living people
Portuguese expatriates in the United States
Portugal–United States relations
1958 births
Recipients of the Order pro Merito Melitensi